Stephen Keener (December 3, 1942March 30, 2022) was a former classically trained actor who provided the voice of various characters in the latter seasons of Transformers. He died on March 30, 2022, from unknown causes.

Voice Roles 

 Fortress Maximus
 Hardhead
 Hun-Gurr
 Mindwipe
 Scattershot
 Scorponok

References

External links
 

1942 births
2022 deaths
American male voice actors